Sabata or Sabdata (Plin. vi. 27. s. 31), was an ancient town of Sittacene, Assyria, probably the same place as the  (Sabatha)of Zosimus (iii. 23), which that writer describes as 30 stadia from the ancient Seleuceia. It is also mentioned by Abulfeda (p. 253) under the name of Sabach.

References

Sittacene
Ancient Assyrian cities
Former populated places in Iraq